This is a list of state parks and reserves in the Wyoming state park system operated  by the Wyoming Division of State Parks and Historic Sites. There are 11 state parks in Wyoming in which one could view the Milky Way in some form.

State parks and recreation areas

State-administered historic sites

References

See also
List of U.S. national parks
List of U.S. state parks

External links
 Wyoming State Parks, Historic Sites & Trails
 Google Map of 13 State Parks

State parks of Wyoming
Wyoming state parks
State parks